Ahmadabad (also Romanized as Aḩmadābād) is a village in Dastjerd Rural District, Khalajastan District, Qom County, Qom Province, Iran. At the 2006 census, its population was 78, in 30 families.

References 

Populated places in Qom Province